Heinrich Palme (25 May 1912 – 20 February 1987) was a German ski jumper.

Career
In 1938 he started to jump for Nazi Germany as to which his homeland was annexed too and that's why he compete at German National Championships. He made his first ski jumping steps at Harrachov.

On 2 March 1941 he touched the ground at world record distance of 109 metres (358 ft) at Bloudkova velikanka hill in Planica, Yugoslavia. After WW2 Palme became the member of Salzburg Ski Club and since 1947 he competed for seniors.

Heinz Palme was the grandfather of the Austrian chief coordinator at Euro 2008 which was held in Austria and Switzerland. He is buried with his wife Imelda in the Salzburg's Maxglan city cemetery.

Invalid ski jumping world record

 Not recognized! Touch ground at world record distance.

References

External links
Peter F. Kramml, Franz Lauterbacher und Guido Müller (Hg.): Maxglan. Hundert Jahre Pfarre 1907−2007. Salzburgs zweitgrößter Stadtfriedhof. Mit 120 Biographien bekannter, bemerkenswerter und berühmter Persönlichkeiten. Salzburg, Stadtpfarramt Maxglan 

German male ski jumpers
1912 births
1987 deaths